Mario Monteforte Toledo  (September 15, 1911 – September 4, 2003) was a Guatemalan writer, dramatist, and politician. Born in Guatemala City, he played important roles in the governments of both Juan José Arévalo and Jacobo Arbenz, including periods as Ambassador to the United Nations between 1946 and 1947, as a deputy in the National Congress from 1947 to 1951, and being both President of the Congress and Vice-President between 1948 and 1949 before retiring from politics in 1951. With the fall of the Arbenz administration in 1954, Monteforte went into exile in Mexico until 1987.

A master of narrative prose, in 1993, Mario Monteforte was awarded the Guatemala National Prize in Literature for his body of work. He died of heart disease in Guatemala City.

Published work

Novels 
Anaité (1948)
Entre la piedra y la cruz (1948)
Donde acaban los caminos (1952)
Una manera de morir (1958)
Llegaron del mar (1966)
Los desencontrados (1977)
Unas vísperas muy largas (1996)
Los adoradores de la muerte (2000)

Short stories 
La cueva sin quietud (1949)
Cuentos de derrota y esperanza (1962)
Casi todos los cuentos (anthology) (1982
Pascualito (children's story) (1991)
La isla de las navajas (1993)
Cuentos de la Biblia (2001)

Essays 
Guatemala. Monografía sociológica (1959–1965)
Las piedras vivas (1965)
Centroamérica, subdesarrollo y dependencia (1973)
Mirada sobre Latinoamérica (1975)
Literatura, ideología y lenguaje (1983)
Los signos del hombre (1984)
Las formas y los días - El barroco en Guatemala (1989)
Palabras del retorno (1992).

External links
Review of Monteforte's autobiographical film Donde acaban los Caminos
Biography in Spanish

1911 births
2003 deaths
People from Guatemala City
Members of the Congress of Guatemala
Presidents of the Congress of Guatemala
Guatemalan diplomats
Guatemalan sociologists
Guatemalan novelists
Male novelists
Guatemalan male short story writers
Guatemalan short story writers
Guatemalan essayists
Male essayists
Guatemalan dramatists and playwrights
Guatemalan male writers
Male dramatists and playwrights
Permanent Representatives of Guatemala to the United Nations
Vice presidents of Guatemala
20th-century novelists
20th-century dramatists and playwrights
20th-century short story writers
20th-century essayists
20th-century male writers